The British Academy of Film and Television Arts (BAFTA) Award for Best Original Screenplay has been presented to its winners since 1984, when the original category (BAFTA Award for Best Screenplay) was split into two awards, the other being the BAFTA Award for Best Adapted Screenplay and Best Original Screenplay.

Woody Allen holds the record for the most wins with four awards.

Winners and nominees

1980s

1990s

2000s

2010s

2020s

Multiple wins and nominations

Multiple wins

Multiple nominations

See also
 Academy Award for Best Story
 Golden Globe Award for Best Screenplay
 Academy Award for Best Original Screenplay
 AACTA International Award for Best Screenplay
 Critics' Choice Movie Award for Best Screenplay
 Writers Guild of America Award for Best Original Screenplay

References

British Academy Film Awards
 
Screenwriting awards for film